Azra was a Yugoslav rock band.

Azra may also refer to:

 Azra (album)
 Azra (horse), American thoroughbred racehorse
 Azra (name), female given name
 Azra District, district of Logar Province, Afghanistan
 Azra, a city from the television series Into the Badlands

See also

 
 
 ASRA (disambiguation)
 Azara (disambiguation)
 Izra, a city in southern Syria